Luis Lobo (born 9 November 1970) is a retired professional male tennis player from Argentina, who won the gold medal in the men's doubles competition at the 1995 Pan American Games.

He reached his career high doubles ranking, World No. 12, on 21 July 1997. He is currently a coach, and has worked with players including Spain's Carlos Moyà and Argentina's Juan Mónaco.

Career finals

Doubles: 20 (12 wins, 8 losses)

Mixed doubles: 1 finals (1 runner-ups)

References

External links
 
 
 

Argentine male tennis players
Tennis players from Buenos Aires
Tennis players at the 1995 Pan American Games
Tennis players at the 1996 Summer Olympics
1970 births
Living people
Pan American Games gold medalists for Argentina
Pan American Games medalists in tennis
Olympic tennis players of Argentina
Medalists at the 1995 Pan American Games